Abraham Zabludovsky (born Abraham Zabludowski Kraveski; June 14, 1924 – April 10, 2003) was a Mexican architect. He was the brother of the well known journalist Jacobo Zabludovsky.

Abraham Zabludovsky was born in Białystok, Poland.  He studied at the Universidad Nacional Autónoma de México, graduating in 1949. In his early years he produced a large number of outstanding residential buildings and offices in Mexico City, making rigorous use of the International style and demonstrating an impeccable handling of contemporary design, techniques and materials. Also notable from this period was the Centro Cívico Cinco de Mayo (1962), Puebla, on which he collaborated with Guillermo Rossell.

In 1968 Zabludovsky began working in collaboration with Teodoro González de León, although the two architects continued to work on some projects individually and retained their separate stylistic identities. Their collaborative work was remarkable for its quality and maturity, establishing functional and formal solutions that were later widely imitated. Clear examples of their characteristic proposals for constructions of massive, linear volume are the Delegación Cuauhtémoc (1972–3; with Jaime Ortiz Monasterio (b 1928) and Luis Antonio Zapiain (b 1942)), the headquarters of INFONAVIT (Instituto del Fondo Nacional de la Vivienda para los Trabajadores, completed 1975) and the new building for the Colegio de México (1974–5; see MEXICO, fig. 7), all in Mexico City.

Zabludovsky also carried out a number of works individually in the same style. Outstanding among these was the Centro Cultural Emilio O. Rabasa (1983), Tuxtla Gutiérrez, Chiapas, a construction with sculptural aspects that manages faithfully to fulfil the need for both theatricality and diffusion. He also designed two multipurpose auditoriums in Celaya and Dolores Hidalgo, Guanajuato (1990), two theatres in Guanajuato, Guanajuato, and Aguascalientes, Aguascalientes (1991), and a convention centre in Tuxtla Gutiérrez, Chiapas (1994).

He died of a heart attack in Mexico City on April 10, 2003, aged 78.

Awards
 Professor Emeritus of the Mexican National Academy of Architecture
 Honorary member of The American Institute of Architects
 Professor Emeritus of the International Academy of Architecture in Sofia, Bulgaria
 Gold Medal at the International Architecture Biennial in Sofia, Bulgaria
 Latin American Grand Prix at the Buenos Aires Biennial
 Honorary mention at the Third International Architecture Biennial in Brazil
 VITRUVIO Award for outstanding achievements in the creation and fomenting of culture

References 

Modernist architects from Mexico
1924 births
2003 deaths
Architects from Mexico City
Architecture firms of Mexico
Jewish architects
Mexican Jews
Mexican people of Polish-Jewish descent
Polish emigrants to Mexico
People from Białystok
National Autonomous University of Mexico alumni
20th-century Polish architects
20th-century Mexican architects
21st-century Mexican architects